Gareth James Edwards (born 13 July 1975) is a British filmmaker. He first gained widespread recognition for Monsters (2010), an independent film in which he served as writer, director, cinematographer, and visual effects artist. He subsequently directed Godzilla (2014), a reboot of Toho's Godzilla franchise and the first film in Legendary's MonsterVerse, and Rogue One: A Star Wars Story (2016), the first installment of the Star Wars anthology series and an immediate prequel to Star Wars: Episode IV – A New Hope (1977).

Career

Gareth Edwards was born on 13 July 1975 in Nuneaton, Warwickshire. He is of Welsh parentage. He attended Higham Lane School followed by college at North Warwickshire College (now NWSLC) under the AV department with lecturers like Graham Bird. Since childhood, he wanted to direct his own films, stating that "Star Wars is definitely the reason that I wanted to become a filmmaker". Edwards studied film and video at the Surrey Institute of Art & Design in Farnham, graduating in 1996. In 2012, he received an honorary Master of Arts from UCA. Edwards got his start in visual effects, creating digital effects for prestigious shows such as Nova, Perfect Disaster and Heroes and Villains, the latter of which a series for which he made 250 visual effects, which won international recognition. In 2008 he entered the Sci-Fi-London 48-hour film challenge, where a movie had to be created start-to-finish in just two days, within certain criteria. Edwards won the contest and went on to write and direct Monsters, his first feature. Edwards personally created the visual effects for Monsters using off-the-shelf equipment. Besides the two main actors, the crew consisted of just five people.

The success of Monsters brought enough awareness in Hollywood to land Edwards a few major projects. After the film's release, he did interviews in Hollywood with several studios, including Legendary Pictures. In January 2011, Edwards landed his first major Hollywood feature, as the director of the 2014 Godzilla reboot from Warner Bros. and Legendary Pictures.

Edwards directed Rogue One, the first Star Wars stand-alone film, written by Chris Weitz and Tony Gilroy, based on a story by John Knoll and Gary Whitta, starring Felicity Jones, and released on 16 December 2016.

Three of his influences for filmmaking are George Lucas, Steven Spielberg and Quentin Tarantino. In May 2016, Edwards exited Godzilla: King of the Monsters in an amicable split with the studio to work on smaller scale projects.

In February 2020, it was reported that Edwards was set to direct and write True Love for New Regency along with Rogue One co-producer Kiri Hart serving as producer for the project. The film is set to star John David Washington.

Filmography

Films 

Short film

Other credits

Television

Other credits

References

External links

 
 Factory Farmed, winner of the Sci-Fi-London 2008 film festival 48 Hour Film Challenge, on Dailymotion.
 Gareth Edwards: Indie Filmmaker, See how Gareth created his independent film with "pro-sumer" equipment.

1975 births
Welsh film directors
Living people
People from Nuneaton
British film directors
English film directors
English film producers
English screenwriters
English cinematographers
Science fiction film directors
British production designers
English people of Welsh descent